Curren De Mille Price, Jr. (born December 16, 1950, in Los Angeles, California) is an American politician of the Democratic Party, currently serving as a Los Angeles city council member for District 9. Price was a California State Senator, representing the state's 26th Senate District which he won in the May 19, 2009 special election to fill the seat vacated by Mark Ridley-Thomas. He previously served as a member of the California State Assembly, representing the state's 51st Assembly District. He was first elected to that position in 2006, and was re-elected in 2008. Price resigned as state senator on July 1, 2013, to be sworn in as Los Angeles city councilman. Holly Mitchell was elected to succeed him in the state senate. Price's tenure as District 9 Councilman has been marked by accusations of pay to play and FBI investigations.

Background and education

Price attended Morningside High School and in 1967 became the first African-American to be elected as the school's student body president.

After graduation from high school, Price earned a scholarship to attend Stanford University, and in 1972, he received a Bachelor of Arts degree from the school in political science.  Thereafter, he studied law at Santa Clara University School of Law. He graduated in 1976 with a Juris Doctor in law.

Following law school, Price worked for an export management company that represented companies in the sales of industrial products in Asia and the Middle East. From 1979 to 1989, Price lived in Washington, D.C., where he was active in the telecommunications industry (satellites, cellular, paging, and cable).  As an advocate for minority enterprise, he was a featured speaker at conferences sponsored by the National Telecommunications and Information Administration of the U.S. Department of Commerce.

Price returned to California in 1988, serving as a deputy to two members of the Los Angeles City Council.

Career
From 1993 to 1997, Price was a member of the Inglewood City Council, representing the city's District 1. In 1997, he was defeated in a bid to become the mayor of Inglewood.  In 2001, he reclaimed his former city council seat and held it until his election to the state assembly in 2006.  As a council member, he was the chair of the City Council Community Economic Development Committee.

In addition to his council responsibilities, Price served on the Los Angeles County Commission on Insurance and the Los Angeles County Metropolitan Transportation Authority's South Bay Governance Council.  For several years, he also served as a consultant with the Small Business Administration-sponsored Small Business Development Center.

Price was first elected to the California State Assembly in 2006 to represent the 51st District, and was re-elected to a second term in 2008.

Allegations of conflict of interest

In 2017, it was reported that Price married Del Richardson before his divorce to his previous wife was finalized. Price failed to disclose his first wife's assets as well as his new wife's assets in his reports. "Since some of Price’s properties are located in the City of Los Angeles, he was supposed to disclose ownership in the event they were impacted by City Council votes on issues such as sidewalk repair, street lighting, street furniture, advertising and redistricting, among others. Price also failed to disclose the businesses owned by second wife Del Richardson-Price including DRA Associates, Just Work Inc. and Cuba Travel Service. If they, or their affiliates, applied for contracts from the LA City Council, Price would have had to recuse himself from those discussions and votes. Councilmember Price also neglected in 2012 to list any of Del Richardson-Price’s clients who paid her more than $10,000 each. A year later, in 2013, at least 20 businesses and government agencies fit that description Price either failed to detail his wife’s client-based income in 2012, or she went from zero-to-20 clients as soon as he was elected to LA City Council."

In 2019, Price was scrutinized over several instances in which he voted on matters benefiting wife's consulting company Del Richardson & Associates. Price voted on decisions involving at least 10 companies in the same years they were listed as providing at least $10,000 in income to Del Richardson & Associates, according to his annual financial disclosures and council records.

FBI investigation

In 2019, the Los Angeles Times reported that Price was amongst a group of Los Angeles Councilmembers being investigated in a corruption probe. The probe was primarily concerned with Chinese investors bankrolling projects in the Los Angeles area. The FBI warrant was in search of possible bribery, extortion, money laundering and other crimes as part of a corruption investigation at City Hall. Price heads a council committee focused on economic development, which reviews taxpayer subsidies offered by the city to hotel developers in and around downtown. In November 2020, when indictments were unsealed against Jose Huizar, no evidence of corruption was presented against Price but five new names were added to the corruption scandal, including former Deputy Mayor Raymond Chan, Wei Huang of San Marino, Shen Zhen New World 1, LLC a company owned and controlled by Huang, Dae (David) Lee of Bel Air and 940 Hill, LLC which is owned by Lee.

External links
Campaign web site
Join California Curren Price

References

African-American state legislators in California
Los Angeles City Council members
Democratic Party California state senators
Democratic Party members of the California State Assembly
1950 births
Living people
People from South Los Angeles
Santa Clara University alumni
Stanford University alumni
21st-century American politicians
21st-century African-American politicians
20th-century African-American people